A list of buildings and structures in São Tomé and Príncipe:

See also
List of hospitals in São Tomé and Príncipe
List of lighthouses in São Tomé and Príncipe

References